Ivan Martin Delock (November 11, 1929 – February 28, 2022) was an American Major League Baseball right-handed pitcher who played 11 seasons for the Boston Red Sox and Baltimore Orioles. He was born in Highland Park, Michigan.

In ten-plus seasons with the Red Sox, Delock had a record of 83–72.  He pitched in at least 20 games for the Red Sox every year from 1952 to 1961 (1954 excepted), and had an Adjusted ERA+ of 110 or better in 1955 (114), 1956 (110), 1958 (118), 1959 (138), and 1961 (110). 

Delock led the American League with 11 relief wins in  while tying for fourth with nine saves (then not an official statistic). In 1958, he was among the league leaders in win percentage and had a 13-game win streak that was broken at the end of July.  His best season was  when he went 11–6 with a 2.95 ERA—1.10 points lower than the league average.  His Adjusted ERA+ in 1959 was 138, and his winning percentage of .647 was fifth best in the American League.

In , a knee injury shortened his career, which ended the following season after Delock made seven appearances, five as a starting pitcher, for the  Orioles. Delock died in Raleigh, North Carolina, on February 28, 2022, at the age of 92.

References

External links
 Baseball-Reference.com
 SABR Biography

1929 births
2022 deaths
Baltimore Orioles players
Baseball players from Michigan
Birmingham Barons players
Boston Red Sox players
Louisville Colonels (minor league) players
Major League Baseball pitchers
Oneonta Red Sox players
People from Highland Park, Michigan
Roanoke Red Sox players
Scranton Red Sox players